Wurmbea graniticola is a species of plant in the Colchicaceae family that is endemic to Australia.

Description
The species is a cormous perennial herb that grows to a height of 1.5–11 cm. Its white to pink flowers appear from July to October.

Distribution and habitat
The species is found in the Avon Wheatbelt, Coolgardie, Esperance Plains, Jarrah Forest and Mallee IBRA bioregions of south-western Western Australia. It grows in clay and sandy soils on granite outcrops.

References

graniticola
Monocots of Australia
Angiosperms of Western Australia
Plants described in 1986
Taxa named by Terry Desmond Macfarlane